Olivier Delaître and Fabrice Santoro were the defending champions, but lost in the first round to Martin Damm and Robbie Koenig.

Brent Haygarth and Aleksandar Kitinov won the title by defeating Jiří Novák and David Rikl 0–6, 6–4, 7–5 in the final.

Seeds

Draw

Draw

References
 Official Results Archive (ATP)
 Official Results Archive (ITF)

1999 ATP Tour
1999 Davidoff Swiss Indoors